KRG may refer to:

Kurdistan Regional Government, Iraq
Kativik Regional Government, Canada
KRG Capital, a private equity firm
Kent Ridge MRT station, Singapore (MRT station abbreviation)